Dark Covenant is a doom metal band from Canada. based in Quebec.  They are signed to France's Emanes Metal Records. Their influences are mainly old-school doom the likes of Candlemass and Solitude Aeturnus.

History
Yves Allaire and Christian Verreault, who had known each other for many years, came together with Christian's brother Stephane to form Dark Covenant in 2009. That year they released a demo CD, which collected positive comments, including a review in Power Metal magazine and a No. 1 position in Metallian Magazine's Top 10 list of Winter 2009/10.

The trio released their first full-length album in 2011, Eulogies for the Fallen, on French label EMANES Metal Records. The album was well received, although criticized for lack of variety among the tracks; the style has been described as slow-paced and melancholy, with operatic vocals.

Discography
 Dark Covenant (demo) (2009)
 Eulogies for the Fallen (2011)

Members
 Christian Verreault - vocals
 Yves Allaire - guitars, keyboards, drums, artwork
 Stephane Verreault - bass

Former members
 Jonathan Hamel - drums

See also

Music of Canada
Canadian rock
List of bands from Canada

References

External links
 Dark Covenant official webpage
 EMANES Metal Records official webpage

Musical groups established in 2009
Musical groups from Montreal
Canadian doom metal musical groups